Road to the Riches is the debut album by hip hop duo Kool G Rap & DJ Polo, which was released in 1989 on then-prominent hip hop label Cold Chillin' Records. The album is notable in that it set off the mafioso rap trend with the title track "Road to the Riches," which received strong rotation on the TV show Yo! MTV Raps, and was later featured on the old-school hip hop radio station Playback FM from the game Grand Theft Auto: San Andreas. Most of the songs, however, are not crime-related. Other popular songs included "It's a Demo" and "Poison." In 1998, Road to the Riches was selected as one of The Sources "100 Best Albums".

Album information
Kool G Rap and DJ Polo were members of the legendary Juice Crew, led by producer Marley Marl. The duo first premiered on Mr. Magic's Rap Attack radio show on 107.5 in 1986 with its first single "It's A Demo." They spent the next few years releasing singles, and eventually wrote and recorded Road to the Riches in 1988, but wasn't released until early 1989. The album showcases G Rap's signature multisyllabic rhyme style with lyric topics ranging from crime, materialism, braggadocio, to love. The production was entirely handled by fellow juice Crew member Marley Marl, who provided a more hard-edged style of production than that of his previous work.

Road to the Riches is often cited as the beginning of the mafioso rap genre, laying the groundwork for future hip hop stars such as Scarface, Nas, Raekwon, Jay-Z, The Notorious B.I.G., and AZ, among others, however the bulk of the album features battle rap lyrics similar to Big Daddy Kane or Rakim without the explicit mafioso or gangsta rap subjects of the title track. G Rap would begin expanding his vivid storytelling and organized crime themes on his next album, Wanted: Dead or Alive and especially on 1992's Live and Let Die.

According to the liner notes in the Roots' Phrenology, "Men at Work" was the song that brought the group together during a lunch period at their high school.

Track listing
All tracks produced by Marley Marl

2006 re-release track listing
All tracks produced by Marley Marl

Disc 1

Disc 2

Later samples
"Road to Riches"
"Disciple" by Nas from the album Street's Disciple
"Bloodshed(Paint the Town Red) by the Harlem hip hop collective Children of the Corn on its only album, which was released years after the song was created and the group disbanded—Children of the Corn: The Collector's Edition.
"Truly Yours"
"Go With The Flow" by MF Doom, from the album Operation: Doomsday.
"Poison"
"Poison" by Bel Biv Devoe, from the album Poison.

Charts

References

1989 albums
Kool G Rap albums
Albums produced by Marley Marl
Cold Chillin' Records albums